USS Lang (FF-1060) was a  of the United States Navy, in service from 1970 to 1991. She was sold for scrapping in 2001.

Construction 
Lang was laid down by Todd Shipyards, Los Angeles Division, San Pedro, California, 25 March 1967; launched 17 February 1968; sponsored by Mrs. Ephraim P. Holmes, wife of Admiral Holmes, Commander in Chief, Atlantic Fleet, and Supreme Allied Commander, Atlantic Fleet. Lang was delivered 20 March 1970 and commissioned 28 March 1970.

Design and description
The Knox-class design was derived from the  modified to extend range and without a long-range missile system. They displaced  at full load. Their crew consisted of 13 officers and 211 enlisted men.

The ships were equipped with one Westinghouse geared steam turbine that drove the single propeller shaft.

The Knox-class ships were armed with a 5"/54 caliber Mark 42 gun forward and a single 3-inch/50-caliber gun aft. They mounted an eight-round RUR-5 ASROC launcher between the 5-inch (127 mm) gun and the bridge. Close-range anti-submarine defense was provided by two twin  Mk 32 torpedo tubes. The ships were equipped with a torpedo-carrying DASH drone helicopter; its telescoping hangar and landing pad were positioned amidships aft of the mack. Beginning in the 1970s, the DASH was replaced by a SH-2 Seasprite LAMPS I helicopter and the hangar and landing deck were accordingly enlarged. Most ships also had the 3-inch (76 mm) gun replaced by an eight-cell BPDMS missile launcher in the early 1970s.

Service history

On 17 October 1989, hours after the Loma Prieta earthquake, Lang left Treasure Island for Hunters Point, where she provided wet steam to the Pacific Gas and Electric Company. Through this effort, PG&E was able to quickly re-establish electrical services to San Francisco. For this effort Lang and her crew were awarded the Humanitarian Service Medal, which was later expanded to include all military members in the San Francisco Bay area at the time.

Lang was decommissioned 12 December 1991, stricken from the Naval Vessel Register 11 January 1995, and sold for scrapping on 15 December 2001.

Notes

References

External links 

DANFS Lang II
NavSource images
Navysite.de
Response To The Loma Prieta Earthquake

 

Knox-class frigates
Cold War frigates and destroyer escorts of the United States
Ships built in Los Angeles
1968 ships
Vietnam War destroyers of the United States